Break Up ( and also known as The Man with the Balloons) is a 1965 Italian comedy film directed by Marco Ferreri.

Plot
A Milanese entrepreneur becomes obsessed with how much air a balloon can take before it breaks. His inability to control this detail destroys his perfect life, leading to madness.

Cast
 Marcello Mastroianni as Mario
 Catherine Spaak as Giovanna
 William Berger as Benny
 Antonio Altoviti
 Sonia Romanoff as Sonia
 Igi Polidoro
 Charlotte Folcher
 Ugo Tognazzi as Man With Car (uncredited)

References

External links

1965 films
1960s Italian-language films
1965 comedy films
Italian black-and-white films
Films directed by Marco Ferreri
Metro-Goldwyn-Mayer films
Films produced by Carlo Ponti
Italian comedy films
Films with screenplays by Rafael Azcona
1960s Italian films